Malikus Saleh Airport is an airport located in Pinto Makmur, Muara Batu, North Aceh Regency, Aceh province. The airport operated by Pertamina, and later by Government of North Aceh Regency.

History 
The airport was built by PT Arun NGL to facilitate the transport of Lhokseumawe and its vicinity to the city of Medan. The airport served by the airline ever since at least Jatayu Air passenger land transport between Banda Aceh and Medan. It is caused by a conflict that broke out between the TNI and GAM, threatening the land transportation in Aceh.

PT Arun NGL initially used aircraft owned by Pelita Air Service to daily flights Lhokseumawe - Medan route. After a few years, flight operations were taken over by the Beechcraft 1900D airliner owned by Travira Air. Towards the lid PT Arun NGL, operation and ownership of the airport were turned over to the City of Lhokseumawe.

Currently,  Citilink and Wings Air are the airlines that fly to airport Malikussaleh on Lhokseumawe-Medan route.

Airlines and destinations

Statistics

References

North Aceh Regency
Airports in Aceh